South Carolina Highway 84 (SC 84) was a state highway that existed in the far northern part of Greenville County. It connected Caesars Head State Park and Jones Gap State Park. Its path was split in two, with the continuing road entering parts of North Carolina.

Route description
SC 84 began at an intersection with U.S. Route 276 (US 276) immediately south of the North Carolina state line in Caesars Head State Park northwest of Cleveland. It traveled to the east-southeast as YMCA Camp Road with a curve farther to the south until it reached the state line again. At the state line, the name changed to Solomon Jones Road.

Approximately  later, Solomon Jones Road reached the state line again, where the name changed back to YMCA Camp Road. It entered Jones Gap State Park. It wound its way mostly to the east-southeast until it reached YMCA Camp Greenville, where it ended.

History
SC 32 was established in 1934 or 1935. In 1947, it was decommissioned.

Major intersections

See also

References

External links
Former SC 84 at the Virginia Highways South Carolina Annex

084
Transportation in Greenville County, South Carolina